Environmental and Resource Economics (ERE) is a peer-reviewed academic journal covering environmental economics published monthly in three volumes per year. It is the official journal of the European Association of Environmental and Resource Economists. Since 1991, it has had a growing influence upon the field of environmental economics.

References

Related links
 European Association of Environmental and Resource Economists (EAERE)

Economics journals
Resource economics
Environmental social science journals
Monthly journals